Miloš Mihajlović (Serbian Cyrillic: Милош Михајловић; born 1 June 1978, in Niš, Serbia) is a Serbian pianist and university professor.

Education
Miloš Mihajlović is a 1999 graduate of the (University of Art) Faculty of Music in Belgrade, and in 2005 completed his postgraduate studies there with the highest distinction. His primary teacher was eminent Serbian pianist and piano teacher, Professor Nevena Popović. He has also studied with noted pianists Sergei Dorensky, Alexander Shtarkman and Michel Dalberto. He was awarded the Emil Hajek Award (as the most talented young pianist) and the Olga Mihailović Fund (as the most perspective young pianist).

Awards and recognitions 
Miloš Mihajlović has won top prizes at a number of international piano competitions:

 1995 - Torino/Moncalieri (Italy) - First prize
 1995 - Tortona (Italy) - First prize - absolute winner
 1996 - Fryderyk Chopin Young Pianists Competition, Rome (Italy) - First prize
 1996 - Jeunesses Musicales, Belgrade (Serbia) - winner of the "Laureates of Orpheus" competition
 1997 - Petar Konjović International competition, Belgrade (Serbia) - First prize (100 points)
 1998 - Nueva Acropolis, Madrid (Spain) - First prize
 1999 - Grand Konzerteum, Athens (Greece) - Second prize (First prize was not awarded)
 1999 - Grand Konzerteum, Athens (Greece) - Prize for the best interpretation of Chopin's composition
 2009 - Southern Highlands, Sydney/Bowral (Australia) - First Prize

Performance career 
As a recitalist and soloist with orchestras Mihajlović has performed in major concert halls in Serbia (Great Hall of the Ilija M. Kolarac Endowment in Belgrade, Gallery of the Serbian Academy of Sciences and Arts, etc.), Bosnia and Herzegovina, Montenegro, Italy, Spain, Greece, Poland. He also took part in programs of several international music festivals, such as: BEMUS
(Belgrade, Serbia), NIMUS (Niš, Serbia), International contemporary music festival in Belgrade etc. In 2005, he got an award from the Stanojlo Rajičić Fund, for the best recital in the concert season. He has collaborated with many eminent musicians, including Yuri Bashmet, Uroš Lajovic, Mladen Jagušt, Angel Šurev, Dejan Savić, Darinka Matić Marović, Anatolij Novicki and Biljana Radovanović.

He has also been broadcast on both, radio and television.

Teaching career 
In June 2001, Miloš Mihajlović began teaching at the University of Arts in Belgrade Faculty of Music as an Assistant in the Piano Division.
Since November 2005, he was appointed a Docent there. In April 2014 he was promoted to associate professor. He has also taught at the Academy of Arts in Banja Luka, Bosnia and Herzegovina.

References

External links 
 Faculty of Music in Belgrade
 Milos Mihajlovic - Official Website

Serbian classical pianists
Academic staff of the University of Arts in Belgrade
Living people
1978 births
Musicians from Niš
University of Arts in Belgrade alumni
Academic staff of the University of Banja Luka
21st-century classical pianists